Homeward Bound is an organisation based in Australia that holds leadership programs for women in science. Founded in 2015, the leadership program aims to increase the representation of women in leadership roles in science fields.

Homeward Bound participants go through a twelve month training program that is focused around the topic of climate change and concluded with a three-week expedition to Antarctica. The first Homeward Bound expedition in 2016 attracted media attention as it was the largest ever all-woman expedition to Antarctica, with 76 participating scientists. Expeditions organised in the following years have had more participants.

Program 
Australian marine ecologist Jessica Melbourne-Thomas and entrepreneur Fabian Dattner founded Homeward Bound in 2015 out of discussions regarding the challenges encountered by women in science. Until the mid-20th century, women were discouraged from exploring Antarctica. Only in 1969 did the first American team of women researchers reach the continent.

The goal of Homeward Bound is to increase the representation of women in leadership roles in science fields. To that end, it plans to organise expeditions to Antarctica for a decade and establish a network of a thousand women capable of taking these roles and shaping policy. The program has participants go through twelve months of leadership training based around the topic of climate change. It is concluded with a three-week expedition to Antarctica, where participants observe the effects of climate change on Antarctica.

A main sponsor of the program is the Spanish energy firm Acciona.

History 
In 2016, Homeward Bound made its inaugural Antarctic expedition with seventy-six scientists of varying fields, then reported to be the largest all-woman expedition to Antarctica. Lack of government support prevented them from sailing out of Tasmania, where the program was founded, so the launch was set in Ushuaia, Argentina. They departed on 2 December and spent twenty days at sea, exploring the Antarctic Peninsula and landing at various American and Argentinian research stations.

Homeward Bound made its next two expeditions in 2018. A second group of seventy-eight participants embarked in February and a third group of eighty participants did so in December. A fourth group of one hundred participants made the expedition in November 2019. Each of the three expeditions was reported to be the largest all-woman expedition to Antarctica at its time. In 2019, participants were selected for a fifth expedition in 2020, however this was later changed to an online program due to the COVID-19 pandemic.

In October 2020, a coalition of 289 scientists and conservation experts associated with Homeward Bound called for the creation of a new marine protected area around the western Antarctic Peninsula. The commentary was published in Nature just as governments convened for the Commission for the Conservation of Antarctic Marine Living Resources.

In 2021, a sixth program of 100 participants was reported to leave in early 2022.

See also 
 Timeline of women in Antarctica
 Women in Antarctica

References

External links 
 

Organisations based in Australia
2016 establishments in Australia
Training organizations
Antarctic expeditions
2010s in Antarctica
2020s in Antarctica
2010s in science
2020s in science